The 1998 Japan Open Tennis Championships was a tennis tournament played on outdoor hard courts at the Ariake Coliseum in Tokyo in Japan that was part of the International Series Gold of the 1998 ATP Tour and of Tier III of the 1998 WTA Tour. The tournament was held from April 13 through April 19, 1998. Andrei Pavel and Ai Sugiyama won the singles titles.

Finals

Men's singles

 Andrei Pavel defeated  Byron Black, 6–3, 6–4.
 It was Pavel's 1st title of the year and the 1st of his career.

Women's singles

 Ai Sugiyama defeated  Corina Morariu, 6–3, 6–3.
 It was Sugiyama's 3rd title of the year and the 7th of her career.

Men's doubles

 Sébastien Lareau /  Daniel Nestor defeated  Olivier Delaître /  Stefano Pescosolido, 6–3, 6–4.
 It was Lareau's 1st title of the year and the 6th of his career. It was Nestor's 1st title of the year and the 9th of his career.

Women's doubles

 Naoko Kijimuta /  Nana Miyagi defeated  Amy Frazier /  Rika Hiraki, 6–3, 4–6, 6–4.
 It was Kijimuta's only title of the year and the 5th of her career. It was Miyagi's 2nd title of the year and the 9th of her career.

References

External links
 Official website
 ATP tournament profile

 
Japan Open Tennis Championships
Japan Open Tennis Championships
Japan Open (tennis)
Japan Open Tennis Championships
Japan Open Tennis Championships